The following is a list of events affecting Pakistani television in 2017. Events listed include television show debuts, and finales; channel launches, and closures; stations changing or adding their network affiliations; and information about changes of ownership of channels or stations.

Television programs

Programs continuing from 2016 (Ended in 2017)

Hum TV
 Bin Roye
 Choti Si Zindagi
 Hatheli
 Kathputli
 Laaj 
 Sanam
 Sang-e-Mar Mar
 Saya-e-Dewar Bhi Nahi

Geo TV
 Dhaani (Geo TV)

2017 Television debuts

Hum TV 
 Alif Allah Aur Insaan 
 Mohabbat Khawab Safar
 Yaqeen Ka Safar
 Phir Wohi Mohabbat
 Sangsaar 
 Toh Dil Ka Kia Hua
 Pagli
 O Rangreza
 Daldal
 Yeh Raha Dil

Geo TV 
 Mohabbat Tumse Nafrat Hai
 Bholi Bano
 Rani
 Hari Hari Churiyaan

Geo Kahani 
 Naagin (17 April 2017– 27 May 
, 2019 )

Urdu 1 
 Be Inteha
 Titli
 Baaghi (27 July 2017 – 1 February 2018)

ARY Digital 
 Rasm E Duniya
 Sun Yaara
 Mera Angan
 Badnaam

References